Hajguiyeh (also Romanized as Hajgū’īyeh and Hajgūeeyeh; also known as Ajgū’īyeh) is a village in Kavirat Rural District, Chatrud District, Kerman County, Kerman Province, Iran. At the 2006 census, its population was 44, in 11 families.

References 

Populated places in Kerman County